Spider-Woman is an animated television series, based on the Marvel Comics character Spider-Woman. The series was produced by DePatie–Freleng Enterprises and Marvel Comics Animation (both owned by Marvel Entertainment), and aired from September 22, 1979 to January 5, 1980 on ABC. It was DePatie–Freleng's final series before its reincorporation as Marvel Productions.

Overview

Introduction 
According to the title sequence, Jessica Drew (voiced by Joan Van Ark) was bitten by a venomous spider as a child; her father saved her life by injecting her with an experimental "spider serum", which also granted her superhuman powers. As an adult, Jessica is editor of Justice Magazine, with two other employees featured; photographer Jeff Hunt (a cowardly braggart who nonetheless fancied himself as a quick-witted and resourceful crime-stopper) and Jessica's teenage nephew Billy. When trouble arises, Jessica slips away to change into her secret identity of Spider-Woman.

The Spider-Woman cartoon should not be confused with Web Woman, a Filmation superheroine cartoon launched at around the same time, which reportedly prompted Marvel Comics into creating a Spider-Woman character to secure the copyright.

Differences between cartoon and comic book 
The cartoon differs considerably from the comic book in its premise and supporting cast. Billy, Jeff, and Justice Magazine never appear in the comic book in any form, nor do the darker elements of the comic book (the heavy use of Arthurian legend and the occult, Jessica's feelings of alienation) enter into the much brighter world of the cartoon. The origin of her powers is also altered somewhat; at the time of the series' production, the threat to her life in the comics was radiation poisoning (though her published origin has since been altered).

The animated Spider-Woman's powers are noticeably modified; her enhanced strength in particular seems entirely missing, as she is shown in several episodes being restrained by means (such as ordinary rope) that her super-strong comic-book counterpart could easily break. In addition to the ability to cling to walls:

 Spider-Woman retains the ability to fire bursts of energy from her hands called "venom blasts", but they are white instead of green. The episode "Realm of Darkness" seems to imply that Venom Blasts can be fired as long as Spider-Woman has enough strength.
 Spider-Woman has powers vaguely similar to ones possessed by Spider-Man that her comic book incarnation lacks:
 A clairvoyant "spider-sense" that allows her to see dangers as they happen;  no matter where she is, she can close her eyes and see the event, shown to the viewers as an image outlined by a spider-web.
 She can also project spider-like "weblines" from the palms of her hands or an individual finger. This appears to be naturally generated, as opposed to Spider-Man's mechanical web-shooters, but she is similarly prone to running out of "web fluid" ("The Ghost Vikings"). She is able to control the direction in which her weblines move; "The Kingpin Strikes Again" shows her casting a web in a descending spiral to disorient and then restrain a criminal.
 The animated Spider-Woman also had the ability to change into costume merely by spinning around, an idea borrowed from the live-action Wonder Woman television series starring Lynda Carter. In the episode "The Spider-Woman and the Fly", where Jessica had been momentarily stripped of her powers, her costume reverted to the everyday civilian clothes she wore for work.
 While Spider-Woman could (at the time) only glide on air currents in the comics, the animated version appears able to fly at will, though her costume's glider wings were apparent whenever she took flight (the comic book incarnation has since gained the power of true flight as well).
 The animated Spider-Woman would occasionally display previously unknown "spider"-powers, conveniently able to assist her in random situations, such as:
 "Spider-telepathy", allowing her to mentally communicate with spiders and ask them for assistance ("Pyramids of Terror").
 A protective "spider-bubble" allowing her to function underwater without diving gear ("The Ghost Vikings").
 Spider-Man in this series was again voiced by Paul Soles who previously voiced him in the 1960s Spider-Man series and some similarities in the two series still remained. Perhaps the most noticeable similarity is "animated stock footage", where – before any episodes were completed – an animated sequence was created. This sequence would be used with an appropriate background added, whenever the need would arise.  One example is Spider-Woman turning around, from back to front. Another example is where Jessica Drew gets a "spider-sense", turns her head while she closes her eyes, and then the location of danger appears using an editing technique.

Cast 
 Joan Van Ark as Jessica Drew / Spider-Woman
 Bruce Miller as Jeff Hunt
 Bryan Scott as Billy Drew
 Larry Carroll as Detective Miller
 Lou Krugman as Police Chief
 Vic Perrin
 Tony Young
 John Milford
 Paul Soles as Peter Parker / Spider-Man
 Ilene Latter
 Karen Machon
 Paul Winchell
 Dick Tufeld as Opening Narrator

Episodes

Home media
In 1982, a 100 minute Spider-Woman VHS tape was released, containing several episodes.  Three episodes of Spider-Woman were originally released as part of the Marvel Comics Video Library VHS series in the mid 1980s. Volumes 6, 13, and 23 contain the Spider-Woman episodes The Spider-Woman and the Fly, Games of Doom and Pyramids of Terror, respectively. Volume 6 was re-released in 1991, minus the bonus Spider-Man episodes. In 2008, volume 6 was released on DVD as Spider-Woman vs. the Fly.

In 2008, this series was planned for release on Region 2 DVD in the UK in by Liberation Entertainment as part of a release schedule of Marvel Animated series. However, the release never came to be due to Liberation going bankrupt. The complete series of Spider-Woman was eventually released on Region 2 DVD format on 20 July 2009. The series was released in a 2-disc set from Clear Vision Ltd. 

Spider-Woman was made available on the Disney+ streaming service at its U.S. launch on November 12, 2019.

Reception

Critical reception 
Chris Sims of Looper stated, "Spider-Woman has the distinction of being the oldest Marvel cartoon currently available on Disney+, and for those of you planning on watching your way through the entire Marvel catalog in chronological order, there are worse places to start. It's definitely every bit as clunky as you'd expect from the late '70s, but it also might be the single most buck wild superhero cartoon ever made. [...] There are definitely better shows to watch on Disney+, but if you're into the goofy stuff, or just want to see how the unfathomable weirdness of the Bronze Age Marvel Universe was translated directly to television, there aren't many that are going to be more fun than this one." David Chapman of Common Sense Media rated the series 3 out of 5 stars, praised the presence of positive role models, stating Jessica Drew is portrayed as a strong and independent female character, and complimented the presence of positive messages, saying the series depicts benevolence and resourcefulness.

References

External links 

 
 

1979 American television series debuts
1980 American television series endings
1970s American science fiction television series
1980s American science fiction television series
Television shows based on Marvel Comics
Animated television series based on Marvel Comics
American Broadcasting Company original programming
American children's animated action television series
American children's animated adventure television series
American children's animated science fantasy television series
American children's animated superhero television series
Animated superheroine television shows
1970s American animated television series
1980s American animated television series
Spider-Woman
Television series by DePatie–Freleng Enterprises
Television series by Marvel Productions
Television series by Disney–ABC Domestic Television
Television series by Saban Entertainment